Filip Majchrowicz (born 9 February 2000) is a Polish professional footballer who plays as a goalkeeper for Cypriot First Division club Pafos, on loan from Radomiak Radom.

References

External links

2000 births
Living people
Sportspeople from Olsztyn
Polish footballers
Association football goalkeepers
Polonia Warsaw players
MKS Cracovia (football) players
Radomiak Radom players
Pafos FC players
Ekstraklasa players
II liga players
III liga players
Poland under-21 international footballers
Polish expatriate footballers
Expatriate footballers in Cyprus
Polish expatriate sportspeople in Cyprus